Hennessy (or Hennessey) is an Irish surname, being the anglicised form of Ó hAonghusa.

Notable people with the surname include:

Arthur Hennessy (1876–1959), Australian pioneer rugby league identity
Bill Hennessy (disambiguation)
Carly Smithson (née Hennessy, born 1983), Irish singer
Christie Hennessy (1945-2007), Irish singer
Claire Hennessy (born 1986), Irish novelist
Clinton Hennessy (born 1977), Irish sportsperson
David Hennessy (1858–1890), police chief of New Orleans
Esmé Frances Hennessy (born 1933), South African botanist
George Hennessy, 1st Baron Windlesham (1877, 1953), British soldier and Conservative politician
Jean Hennessy (1874–1944), French politician and member of the Hennessy family
Jacqueline Hennessy (born 1968), journalist
Jill Hennessy (born 1968), film and television actress
Joe Hennessy (born 1956), former Irish sportsperson
Archbishop John Hennessy (1825–1900), head of the Roman Catholic Archdiocese of Dubuque
John L. Hennessy (born 1953), American computer scientist and current president of Stanford University
John Pope Hennessy (1834–1891), Irish colonial administrator and politician - eighth governor of Hong Kong, fifteenthth governor of Mauritius, MP for King's County
Josh Hennessy (born 1985), professional ice hockey player
Kevin Hennessy (born 1961), Irish retired sportsperson
Larry Hennessy (1929–2008), American basketball player
Matt Hennessy (born 1997), American football player
Matthew Hennessy, Irish computer scientist
Miranda Hennessy, British actress and comedian
Neil Hennessy (born 1978), musician and music producer/engineer
Patrick Hennessy, several people including
Patrick Hennessy (painter), (1915–1980), an Irish artist
 Sir Patrick Hennessy (industrialist), (1898–1981), an Irish-born British industrialist,
Peter Hennessy (born 1947), English historian of government
Ryan Hennessy (born 1995), Irish singer and musician 
Séamus Hennessy, Irish sportsperson
Swan Hennessy (1866–1929), Irish-American composer resident in Paris
Thomas Hennessy, Irish politician
Thomas Hennessy (American football) (born 1994), American football player
W. Louis Hennessy (born 1955), 4th Circuit Court Associate Judge in Maryland, former Maryland Delegate
William Hennessy (disambiguation)

See also
Hennessey (surname)

Surnames of Irish origin
Anglicised Irish-language surnames